This is an index of lists of shipwrecks, sorted by different criteria.

By location 
 List of shipwrecks of Africa
 List of shipwrecks of Asia
 List of shipwrecks of Europe
 List of shipwrecks of France
 List of shipwrecks of the United Kingdom
 List of shipwrecks of England
 List of shipwrecks of North America
 List of shipwrecks of Canada
 List of shipwrecks of the United States
 List of shipwrecks of California
 List of shipwrecks of Florida
 List of shipwrecks in the Great Lakes
 List of shipwrecks of Massachusetts
 List of shipwrecks of North Carolina
 List of shipwrecks of Oregon
 List of shipwrecks of South America
 List of shipwrecks of Oceania
 List of shipwrecks of Australia
 List of shipwrecks in international waters
 List of shipwrecks in the Atlantic Ocean
 List of shipwrecks in the Pacific Ocean
 List of shipwrecks in the Indian Ocean

By date

Before 1914

1914 to 1938 

World War I was 1914–1918.

1939 to 1945 

World War II was 1939–1945.

After 1945

War and warships

By type of ship 
 List of sunken aircraft carriers
 List of sunken battlecruisers
 List of sunken battleships
 List of sunken nuclear submarines

By war 
 List of warships sunk during the Russo-Japanese War
 List of hospital ships sunk in World War I
 List of maritime disasters in World War I
 List of foreign ships wrecked or lost in the Spanish Civil War
 List of maritime disasters in World War II

By navy 
 List of ships sunk by the Imperial Japanese Navy
 List of Allied ships lost to Italian surface vessels in the Mediterranean (1940–43)
 List of wrecked or lost ships of the Ottoman steam navy

By method 
 List of ships sunk by missiles

See also 
 :Category: Lists of shipwrecks by year
 List of wreck diving sites

 
Lists of transport accidents and incidents

de:Liste der Katastrophen der Seefahrt